Angelo Paina (born April 19, 1949) is a former Italian footballer who played as a striker. He made 300 appearances in the Italian professional leagues. Paina played three seasons (38 games, 3 goals) in Serie A for A.C. Milan and Atalanta.

References

1949 births
Living people
People from Lodi, Lombardy
Italian footballers
Association football forwards
Calcio Padova players
U.S. Triestina Calcio 1918 players
A.C. Milan players
Taranto F.C. 1927 players
S.P.A.L. players
Atalanta B.C. players
Serie A players
Serie B players
Footballers from Lombardy
Sportspeople from the Province of Lodi